Lophostachys cyanea is a plant native to the Cerrado vegetation of Brazil.

External links
 Lophostachys cyanea

cyanea
Flora of Brazil